Fiola is an Italian restaurant located in Washington, D.C. that opened in 2011. It has received positive reviews in The Washington Post. It is one of several restaurants owned by the couple Fabio and Maria Trabocchi in the city. The Trabocchis have announced plans to open a second location in Miami.

Located on Pennsylvania Avenue between the United States Capitol and the White House, U.S. politicians are regularly seen eating at Fiola, including President Barack Obama and First Lady Michelle Obama. In September 2018, at the height of the controversy over the Brett Kavanaugh Supreme Court nomination, Senator Ted Cruz and his wife were confronted by protesters at the restaurant, after which they left. This led to criticism on websites such as Yelp.


Awards
 2012 Bon Appétit 50 Best New Restaurants in America
 2012 Best New Restaurant, Restaurant Association of Metropolitan Washington
 2014 Best Formal Dining Restaurant, Restaurant Association of Metropolitan Washington
 2017 Michelin Guide, one Michelin Star

See also
 List of Italian restaurants
 List of Michelin starred restaurants in Washington, D.C.

References

External links
 

Restaurants in Washington, D.C.
2011 establishments in Washington, D.C.
Italian restaurants in the United States
Michelin Guide starred restaurants in the United States
Restaurants established in 2011
Italian-American culture in Washington, D.C.